Demetrius and the Gladiators is a 1954 American biblical drama film and a sequel to The Robe.  The picture was made by 20th Century Fox, directed by Delmer Daves and produced by Frank Ross. The screenplay was written by Philip Dunne based on characters created by Lloyd C. Douglas in The Robe.

The movie presents Victor Mature as Demetrius, a Christian slave made to fight in the Roman arena as a gladiator, and Susan Hayward as Messalina, a reprobate who is the wife of Claudius, the uncle of the depraved emperor Caligula. The cast also features Ernest Borgnine, William Marshall, Michael Rennie, Jay Robinson as Caligula, Debra Paget, Anne Bancroft in one of her earlier roles, and Julie Newmar as a briefly seen dancing entertainer. The film is in Technicolor and CinemaScope.

Plot

After his friend Marcellus is executed for heresy and treason, Demetrius makes it his mission to hide the Robe of Christ, revealing its location to no one. One day, while doing chores for his beloved Lucia (Debra Paget), he is arrested for assaulting a Roman centurion and sentenced to the arena. There, Demetrius trains as a gladiator and soon wins acclaim, proving his valor against a pack of hungry tigers. The emperor, Caligula, assigns him as bodyguard of Messalina (Susan Hayward), unfaithful wife of Claudius (Barry Jones), but he soon tires of waiting on his new mistress and returns to the arena. Later, Lucia disguises herself to gain entrance to the gladiator school to see Demetrius. However, the two are forcibly separated on orders from a jealous Messalina. Lucia is then assaulted by Dardanius (Richard Egan) and four other gladiators. Demetrius prays for God to save her, but it seems that Dardanius has broken Lucia's neck. All present are shocked at Lucia's sudden demise, especially Demetrius, who loses all faith in Christ.

Previously, he had avoided killing human competitors in the Emperor's games because of his religion, but all that now changes. His next time in the arena, not only does he fight, but he ferociously kills all five of the gladiators that took part in the assault on Lucia. The spectators, including the Emperor, are thrilled at his savagery. Caligula asks Demetrius to renounce Christ, and he does so. As a result, Caligula frees him and inducts him into the Praetorian Guard with the rank of Tribune. Having rejected Christianity, Demetrius begins a lusty affair with Messalina that lasts for months. One day, Caligula holds audience with Demetrius and orders him to retrieve the Robe. But while carrying out the emperor's command, he is surprised to discover Lucia, lying on a bed, clutching the Robe. It turns out she never died after all. Demetrius realizes his mistake, prays to God for forgiveness, and Lucia awakens.

Nevertheless, Demetrius takes the Robe to the Emperor, as ordered. Later, he is horrified when he learns the Emperor has had a prisoner killed so that he can use the powers of the Robe to bring him back to life—which he fails to do. As Demetrius steps toward Caligula to attack, he is stopped by the guards and, on Caligula's orders, he is sent back to the arena. When Demetrius refuses to take part in the mayhem, the Emperor tries to have Demetrius executed. But the Praetorian Guard (already angry at Caligula over bad wages and conditions) turns against Caligula, killing him. Claudius is then installed as the new emperor. In his first formal address as Rome's leader, Claudius decrees that those of the Christian faith will no longer be persecuted by the state. He then commands Demetrius to return the Robe to the care of the disciple Peter and his followers.

Cast

Production
The sequel was planned even before The Robe had been released. It was originally known as The Story of Demetrius. Filming was completed by September 1953.

Reception
Demetrius and the Gladiators was a massive commercial success. In its initial release, the film earned $4.25 million in US theatrical rentals, against a budget of less than $2 million. Overall, it grossed $26 million in North America, making it one of the highest-grossing films of 1954.

Bosley Crowther of The New York Times wrote that "we've got to hand it to Producer Frank Ross and Philip Dunne, the writer who put this one together out of whole cloth instead of 'The Robe' ... they have millinered this saga along straight Cecil B. Devotional lines, which means stitching on equal cuttings of spectacle, action, sex and reverence." Variety called the film "a worthy successor" to The Robe, "beautifully fashioned with all the basics of good drama and action that can play, and quite often do, against any setting, period or modern." Edwin Schallert of the Los Angeles Times wrote, "As long as Mature is merely bluffing at being a gladiator, and trying at the same time to remain true to the principles of Christianity, the drama of the picture limps along ... Once Mature suddenly goes on a rampage as a fighter in the arena, 'Demetrius' takes on new life. It holds onto that animation most creditably even when its central character reforms." Richard L. Coe of The Washington Post stated, "Because there is less of the religious aspect of its Lloyd C. Douglas predecessor, and much more of the man-versus-lions-versus-men-versus-women-versus-vino of the early Cecil B. DeMille school herein, I suspect that, moviewise at least, 'Demetrius and the Gladiators' is a more enjoyable, less stuffy entertainment." Harrison's Reports wrote, "Excellent! As a general rule, it is too much to hope that a sequel to an outstanding picture will be as good as the original, but 'Demetrius and the Gladiators,' which is a CinemaScope sequel to 'The Robe,' is one of the rare exceptions to the rule, for it not only matches the spectacular production quality of the original but also surpasses it in entertainment appeal." The Monthly Film Bulletin wrote, "This sequel to The Robe seems much less inhibited by religious awe than its predecessor. Its spectacle is more lusty; its vulgarity unabashed. Twice it turns back reverently to The Robe (in flashback) as to a chastening altar, but happily soon regains its own noisy bounce in describing suggestive doings in dirty ancient Rome."

References

External links

 
 
 
 

1954 films
20th Century Fox films
American drama films
American epic films
Cultural depictions of Claudius
Cultural depictions of Messalina
Depictions of Caligula on film
Films about Christianity
Films about gladiatorial combat
Films directed by Delmer Daves
Films scored by Franz Waxman
Films set in the 1st century
Films set in the Roman Empire
Films with screenplays by Philip Dunne
Peplum films
Sword and sandal films
CinemaScope films
1950s English-language films
1950s American films
1950s Italian films